Bedřîchov is a municipality and village in Jablonec nad Nisou District in the Liberec Region of the Czech Republic. It has about 300 inhabitants.

Sport

There is a ski resort at Bedřichov, which was used during the 2009 Nordic World Ski Championships in Liberec. It is popular for cross-country skiing and downhill skiing.

References

External links

Villages in Jablonec nad Nisou District
Ski areas and resorts in the Czech Republic